Here are the match results of the 2007 Rugby union season.
Qualifiers for the 2011 Rugby World Cup, meanwhile the Six Nations Championship and the Tri Nations was also set for another season.

International competitions
 113th Six Nations Championship series is won by 
 2007 Rugby World Cup held in stadiums throughout France, with matches also held in Edinburgh and Cardiff. South Africa beat defending champions England in the final 15–6 to win the World Cup.
 2007 Super 14 Final at ABSA Stadium, Durban – The Bulls score a converted try after the final horn to defeat the homestanding Sharks  20–19, becoming the first South African team to win the Super Rugby competition in its professional era.
 2007 Heineken Cup Final at Twickenham, London – London Wasps deny Leicester Tigers a treble with a 25–9 win.
Domestic competitions
 English Premiership – Leicester Tigers
 Top 14 – Stade Français
 Celtic League – Ospreys
 EDF Energy Cup – Leicester Tigers
 Air New Zealand Cup – Auckland
 Currie Cup – Free State Cheetahs
 Australian Rugby Championship – Central Coast Rays

See also
2007 in sports

 
Years of the 21st century in rugby union